Canyon Creek is a stream in the U.S. state of Idaho. It is a tributary of the Teton River.

Canyon Creek was named for the deep canyon through which it flows.

References

Rivers of Madison County, Idaho
Rivers of Idaho